A pulsar clock is a clock which depends on counting radio pulses emitted by pulsars.

Pulsar clock in Gdańsk
The first pulsar clock in the world was installed in St Catherine's Church, Gdańsk, Poland, in 2011. It was the first clock to count the time using a signal source outside the Earth, other than sun dials. The pulsar clock consists of a radiotelescope with 16 antennas, which receive signals from six designated pulsars. Digital processing of the pulsar signals is done by an FPGA device.

Pulsar clock in Brussels
On October 5, 2011, a display showing the exact time of the pulsar clock, as a repeater of Gdańsk's pulsar clock, was installed in the European Parliament in Brussels, Belgium.

References

Clocks in Poland
Clocks in Belgium
Pulsars
Culture in Gdańsk
Culture in Brussels